The Municipality of McCreary is a rural municipality (RM) in the Parkland Region of Manitoba, Canada.

Geographically located between Riding Mountain National Park and Lake Manitoba, the majority of the municipal lands are within the drainage basin of the Turtle River.

It is the self-proclaimed "Ski and Maple Syrup Capital of Manitoba."

History

The RM was incorporated on January 1, 2015 via the amalgamation of the RM of McCreary and the Village of McCreary. It was formed as a requirement of The Municipal Amalgamations Act, which required that municipalities with a population less than 1,000 amalgamate with one or more neighbouring municipalities by 2015. The Government of Manitoba initiated these amalgamations in order for municipalities to meet the 1997 minimum population requirement of 1,000 to incorporate a municipality.

Communities 
 Glencairn
 McCreary (unincorporated urban community)
 Norgate
 Reeve

Demographics 

References 

Rural municipalities in Manitoba
2015 establishments in Manitoba
Manitoba municipal amalgamations, 2015
Populated places established in 2015